Tropical Depression Sixteen-E was the final tropical cyclone of the 2004 Pacific hurricane season. The storm developed out of a tropical wave that moved off the western coast of Africa on October 8. The wave crossed the Atlantic Ocean and entered the eastern Pacific on October 18. The system began to gradually organize, and on October 25 it was classified as a tropical depression. The storm did not significantly intensify, as wind shear prevented it from attaining tropical storm status. The short-lived depression moved northward, and made landfall in Mexico on October 26. Quickly deteriorating, the system dissipated shortly thereafter, although its remnants persisted for a couple more days. The depression had no major effects on land. However, it produced heavy rainfall in parts of Mexico, and the remnants triggered thunderstorms over the southwestern United States.

Meteorological history

On October 8, 2004, a tropical wave emerged from the west coast of Africa and progressed westward through the Atlantic Ocean. As is typical of disturbances in the late hurricane season, the wave maintained a relatively low latitude during its trek across the Atlantic. On October 18, the system emerged into the eastern Pacific Ocean. Convection developed along the wave axis, and an area of low pressure developed the next day, while situated south of Guatemala. It drifted westward uneventfully until October 23, when it became nearly stationary. Strong thunderstorms amplified and organized into banding features early on October 24. Dvorak classifications were issued on the weather feature, and over the following day it moved slowly towards the north.

The depression intensified slightly, and attained its peak winds of 35 mph (55 km/h) almost immediately after forming. As such, it never attained tropical storm status; however, had it been upgraded, it would have been named Madeline. The large cyclone moved towards the north along the western edge of the Mexican subtropical ridge. Even shortly after the storm's classification, the National Hurricane Center (NHC) remarked that Sixteen-E would have little time to significantly strengthen, although noted the possibility for it to achieve minimal tropical storm status. At the time, the storm was being disrupted by wind shear, with most of its deep convective activity concentrated in the eastern half of the circulation.

At around 20:00 UTC, an area of strong convection, including cold cloud tops, developed near the center of circulation. The burst of thunderstorms may have been related to an approaching trough. Tropical Depression Sixteen-E continued moving towards the coast of Mexico, and at 00:00 UTC on October 26, it reached its lowest barometric pressure of 1004 mbar (hPa; 29.65 inHg). It crossed the southwestern Gulf of California before moving ashore between Guasave and Topolobampo. The deteriorating cyclone moved inland, and the last advisory was issued by the NHC on the storm shortly thereafter. Although the storm dissipated at 18:00 UTC, its remnants persisted as they moved across northern Mexico. The system interacted with a weather front in the southwestern United States and triggered thunderstorms there.

Impact
On October 25, a tropical storm warning was issued for the coastline of Mexico from El Roblito northward to Topolobampo. This advisory was discontinued the next day, and no additional tropical cyclone watches and warnings were posted. The storm produced areas of heavy rainfall. At Culiacan,  of precipitation fell in a 24-hour period;  fell at Empalme. Despite localized flooding, no damage or fatalities were reported. A possible tornado may have also touched down near there. Offshore, a ship—the Diamond Princess—recorded  winds on two separate occasions during October 26, potentially suggesting that the storm was stronger than it was believed to be. The interaction between the depression's remnants and a frontal boundary over the southwestern United States produced strong thunderstorms and heavy precipitation in eastern New Mexico, western and central Texas, and much of Oklahoma.

See also

Timeline of the 2004 Pacific hurricane season

References

External links

Advisory archive

16E
16E
2004 Pacific hurricane season
16-E